Samaritan Hospital or variant, may refer to:

 , WWII US Navy hospital ship
 Samaritan Health Services, Corvallis, Oregon, US; a hospital network
 Samaritan Albany General Hospital, Albany, Oregon, US
 Samaritan Lebanon Community Hospital, Lebanon, Oregon, US
 Samaritan North Lincoln Hospital, Lincoln City, Oregon, US
 Samaritan Pacific Communities Hospital, Newport, Oregon, US
 Samaritan Health System, Phoenix, Arizona, US; a hospital network
 Samaritan Hospital (Troy, New York), in upper New York (state)
 Samaritan Hospital for Women, London, England, UK; former hospital and Grade II listed building
 Royal Samaritan Hospital, Glasgow, Scotland, UK; former women's hospital
 Samaritan Hospital Nottingham (aka Nottingham Samaritan Hospital or Samaritan Hospital), Nottingham, England, UK; former women's hospital

See also
 Samaritan's Touch Care Center, Highlands County, Florida, US; an outpatient clinic network
 Good Samaritan Hospital (disambiguation)
 Samaritan (disambiguation)